Khmeriosicyos is a genus of flowering plants belonging to the family Cucurbitaceae. Its native range is Southern Indo-China.

Species 
 Khmeriosicyos harmandii W.J.de Wilde & Duyfjes

References

Cucurbitaceae
Cucurbitaceae genera